Elcione Therezinha Zahluth Barbalho is a Brazilian pedagogue, politician, current Federal Deputy for the Brazilian state of Pará, president of the legislature's Defense of Women Rights Committee, former first lady of the state of Pará during both of her ex-husband's terms as governor (1983–1987 and 1991–1994) and mother of the current governor of the state.

References 

1944 births
Brazilian Democratic Movement politicians
Members of the Chamber of Deputies (Brazil) from Pará
Living people